Beasley is a neighbourhood in the Lower City area of Hamilton, Ontario, Canada. The Beasley neighbourhood is bounded in the north by the Canadian National Railway tracks just north of Barton Street, James Street (west), Main Street (south) and Wellington Street (east).

History
The Beasley neighbourhood is one of the oldest and one of the first 4 neighbourhoods of Hamilton. The other three being Central, Durand and Corktown. Named after Richard Beasley, (1761-1842), was a soldier, political figure, farmer and businessman in Upper Canada. Richard Beasley was one of Hamilton's first settlers who came to Canada from New York in 1777. Beasley occupied Burlington Heights (now the site of Dundurn and Harvey Parks) in 1790 & was granted land by the Crown in 1799. A local entrepreneur, Beasley's business ventures included fur trading, land acquisition and establishment of a grill mill in Ancaster. He was a member of the legislative assembly of Upper Canada from 1791 to 1804 and was appointed colonel of the 2nd regiment of the York militia in 1809. Financial difficulties forced Beasley to sell lands at Burlington Heights, but it was purchased in 1832 by Sir Allan Napier MacNab who built Dundurn Castle on foundations of Beasley's brick home.

Beasley Park in the neighbourhood is also named after him.

Festivals
Hamilton was also home to an annual Mustard Festival from 1998 to 2010. Hamilton is home to the largest miller of dry mustard in the world. It was held annually at Ferguson Station, Ferguson Avenue at Hamilton's International Village and was a summertime food & beverage festival that featured some of the top Blues and Jazz acts in the region.

Public transportation
The Hamilton Street Railway (abbreviated as HSR) operates all public transit vehicles in the city of Hamilton, Ontario.

Below are the HSR Bus Routes found in the Beasley neighbourhood:
1/1A King
2 Barton
3 Cannon
10 Beeline Express (interlined with 55/55A/58)

Attractions
Beasley Park
Beasley Park Community Centre
Seventy-Seven Night Club
The Baltimore House, a music venue and nightclub
The Underground, Steel City Music Venue
Theatre Aquarius, Dofasco Centre for the Performing Arts, downtown
Summertime Mustard Festival at the Ferguson Station (historic site)- defunct Grand Trunk Railway train station.
International Village (shopping district)
Wellington Park

Historical buildings
Royal Connaught Hotel/ Holiday Inn
The Hamilton Courthouse, with the United Empire Loyalists statue Statue info. at myhamilton.ca
Ramada Plaza (hotel)
The Cannon Knitting Mill - defunct Chipman-Holton Knitting Company mill, currently poised for redevelopment
Ferguson Station (historic site)- defunct Grand Trunk Railway train station, site of the summertime Mustard Festival
Hamilton General Hospital
Hamilton Downtown Mosque
Stewart Memorial Church (originally St. Paul's African Methodist Episcopal Church. 1961 became a Masonic Hall. North of Wilson on John Street)

See also
List of streets in Hamilton, Ontario
List of neighbourhoods in Hamilton, Ontario

References

MapArt Golden Horseshoe Atlas - Page 647 - Grids F12, G12, F13, G13

Local media/ web links
Our Beasley Website
The Beasley Badger

Neighbourhoods in Hamilton, Ontario